63 Aurigae is a single star located around 395 light years away from the Sun in the northern constellation of Auriga. It is visible to the naked eye as a faint, orange-hued star with an apparent magnitude of 4.91. It is moving closer to the Earth with a heliocentric radial velocity of −28 km/s.

This is an evolved giant star with a stellar classification of K4 III. After exhausting the hydrogen at its core, the star has expanded to 37 times the radius of the Sun. It is radiating 335 times the Sun's luminosity from its enlarged photosphere at an effective temperature of 4,068 K.

References

K-type giants
Auriga (constellation)
Durchmusterung objects
Aurigae, 63
054716
034752
2696